Vallan Symms (born 20 March 1980) is a Belizean football defender, who currently plays for Defence Force.

International career
Symms made his debut for Belize in a March 2000 FIFA World Cup qualification match against Guatemala and earned a total of 13 caps, scoring 3 goals.
He has represented Belize in 6 FIFA World Cup qualification matches and played at the 2001 and 2005 UNCAF Nations Cup.

His final international was at that 2005 tournament, the third game against Nicaragua. However he has recently played at the 2014 FIFA World Cup qualification against Montserrat.

International goals
Scores and results list Belize's goal tally first.

External links

References

1980 births
Living people
Belizean footballers
Belize international footballers
2001 UNCAF Nations Cup players
2005 UNCAF Nations Cup players
Association football defenders
FC Belize players
Verdes FC players
Belize Defence Force FC players